is a national highway located entirely within Chiba Prefecture, Japan. It connects the cities of Mobara and Futtsu, spanning the Bōsō Peninsula in an east–west routing.

Route description
National Route 465 connects the cities of Mobara and Futtsu, spanning Chiba Prefecture's Bōsō Peninsula in an east–west routing. The highway's eastern terminus lies at a junction with National Route 409 in Mobara, where it begins its concurrency with National Route 128. The two highways pass through the municipalities of Chōsei and Ichinomiya heading south towards the city of Isumi along the eastern coast of the peninsula.

In Isumi the highways diverge, with National Route 128 continuing south along the coast towards the southern tip of the peninsula and National Route 465 heading west towards its interior, paralleling the Isumi Line. Crossing into the mountainous town of Ōtaki, the highway meets National Route 297 just to the west of the town's central district. The two highways share a brief concurrency running south through the relatively dense area, after which National Route 465 continues west, paralleling the Isumi Line to the railway's terminus at Kazusa-Nakano Station.

Crossing into the city of Kimitsu, the highway continues winding its way west through the peninsula's mountainous interior. Near Kazusa-Kameyama Station the highway curves to the northwest and meets National Route 410 shortly after. The highways share another concurrency descending from the mountains, traveling though the narrow Yomachisaku Daiichi Tunnel, and then curving towards the southwest. The two routes diverge at the foot of Mount Kano. National Route 465 passes into the city of Futtsu directly to the south of the mountain. Just to the east of central Futtsu, the highway meets National Route 127, they share yet another concurrency traveling north together through central Futtsu towards the Tateyama Expressway. The aforementioned highways travel alongside each other for a brief period with Futtsu-chūō interchange linking them before the highways all separate within the vicinity of Sanukimachi Station. National Route 465 travels directly to that train station, paralleling the Uchibō Line to the highway's western terminus at a junction with National Route 16 on Cape Futtsu.

History

The tunnel is the second oldest tunnel that is designated as a part of a national highway in Japan.

National Route 465 was established by the Cabinet of Japan in 1993. A re-aligning and widening project along the highway in the city of Kimitsu was completed on 31 March 2015. The project resolved problems created by several repetitive tight curves. On 23 December 2015, a  section of the Yomachisaku Daiichi Tunnel's shotcrete lining collapsed following a re-application of the supportive lining a month prior to the collapse. The tunnel lining was repaired by the following day.

Major intersections
The route lies entirely within Chiba Prefecture.

See also

References

External links

National highways in Japan
Roads in Chiba Prefecture